Full Circle is a 2008 full-length documentary film about the INS Dakar, an Israeli Sea Corps submarine that disappeared in 1968, the wreckage of which was found in 1999.

The film was co-directed by Tony Klinger and Arnon Manor, and narrated by Rick Zieff.

The movie, which took ten years to make, premiered in the UK on 13 January 2008, in a charity showing in aid of World Jewish Relief.

Footnotes

References

2008 films
2000s English-language films